Power is a 2016 Indian Bengali-language action comedy film directed by Rajiv Kumar Biswas. The film's soundtrack is composed by Jeet Gannguli. It features Jeet, Sayantika Banerjee and Nusrat Jahan in lead roles. It is a remake of the 2014 Telugu film Power starring Ravi Teja. The film was not successful at the box office.

Plot
The plot is about a man who was supposed to be a look-alike of an honest police officer in his previous life and is eager to join the police. He gets the opportunity, and what follows next is a thrilling ride of comedy with Kharaj, and action along with a flashback to his previous life, where he was revealed to be the same person altogether forgetting his memory except his passion for being a police officer.

Cast

 Jeet as Jeetu , originally known as ACP Bir Pratap Chowdhury, Selimpur Police Station
 Sayantika Banerjee as Anjali
 Nusrat Jahan as Shruti, Bir Pratap's love interest
 Sabyasachi Chakrabarty as Police Commissioner Ranjit Kumar Kapuria
 Rajatava Dutta as Home Minister Ramkrishna Ganguly
 Kharaj Mukherjee as Officer in charge Bhojon Ghosh, Haldia Police Station
 Kanchan Mullick as Kanchan
 Dipanjan Basak as Joy Krishna Ganguly
 Shantilal Mukherjee as Hari
 Bharat Kaul as Gobardhan
 Manasi Sinha as Jeetu's elder sister
 Sumit Ganguly as Goon
 Devdut Ghosh as Inspector Pradip Kumar Sarkar
 Raja Dutta as Feroz Bhai
 Sudip Mukherjee as Inspector S. Banerjee
 Biswajit Chakraborty as Rajat Pratap Chowdhury
 Moushumi Saha as Nilanjana Pratap Chowdhury
 Sanjib Sarkar as former ACP Avinash Mondal
 Debraj Mukherjee as Inspector P. Biswas
 Kalyani Mondal as Mayawati Ganguly
 Supriyo Dutta as Bijoy Sanyal, Ramkrishna's PA
 Somnath Kar as Deb Krishna Ganguly

Soundtrack

References

External links
 

Bengali-language Indian films
2010s Bengali-language films
2016 films
Indian action comedy films
2016 action comedy films
Indian police films
Fictional portrayals of the West Bengal Police
Bengali remakes of Telugu films
Films scored by Jeet Ganguly
Films directed by Rajiv Kumar Biswas
2010s police comedy films